The 2010–11 season of FC Bayern Munich began on 21 June with their first training session.

Off-season
Bayern already made a few squad changes. They released the previously loaned out Luca Toni from his contract and sold Christian Lell to Hertha BSC. The contracts of multiple players expired and were not extended: Michael Rensing eventually ended up at 1. FC Köln, while Andreas Görlitz joined FC Ingolstadt. Meanwhile, José Sosa was sold to Napoli.

Breno and Andreas Ottl both returned from 1. FC Nürnberg, where they had been on loan since the winter break; Toni Kroos came back from an 18-month loan to Leverkusen; and Edson Braafheid returned from a six-month spell at Celtic. Save for Rouven Sattelmaier, Bayern opted in the end to make no new signings in the summer transfer window ending at 31 August.

Pre-season
Head coach Louis van Gaal divided the pre-season into two phases, as many of his players participated in the World Cup and were only later available for the club. The initial phase began with the first training on 21 June. In this phase, which lasted until 4 July, the first squad trained with the second team and a friendly at the fanclub "Lohner Bayern Union" was held. On 30 June, the club announced that 18-year-old David Alaba had signed his first professional contract at Bayern.

The second phase began on 15 July. As 13 players participated in the 2010 World Cup, Van Gaal had only 11 first teamers at his disposal. His training squad was thus complemented with the second team. Franck Ribéry and Martín Demichelis were the first players from World Cup squads that resumed training, but only after the training camp in Riva del Garda from 19–24 July. The remaining nine players from the German and Dutch squads returned on 2 August. While Van Gaal was proud to have the most players of any club in the final games of the World Cup, he lamented that "this is not a good pre-season." But he was even more displeased with the FIFA scheduling an international matchday on 11 August, in between the Super Cup and the first round of the DFB-Pokal. The coach actually advised his players to ask the German Football Association (DFB) to be excused for the game: "If eight Bayern players said they'd withdraw, the DFB would listen, I believe." The warning ended in a healthy compromise, where most of the players with substantial playing time at the World Cup were not picked by German coach Joachim Löw. For Bayern, this meant losing only Toni Kroos and Mario Gómez to the international date. The pre-season ended on 16 August with the first round of the DFB-Pokal, where Bayern played Germania Windeck and advanced to the second round.

There was unfortunate news at the return of the last internationals for Bayern, after medical tests confirmed that Arjen Robben's sustained injury in a pre-World cup friendly had not properly healed and that he would be out for a further two months. Bayern Chairman Karl-Heinz Rummenigge stated, "Of course, Bayern Munich are very angry" with the Royal Dutch Football Association (KNVB), and would be seeking compensation from them, continuing, "Once again we must pay the bill as a club after a player is seriously injured playing for a national team." At the end of August, new tests showed slower than anticipated healing in Robben's muscle, leading to fears that Robben might not play again before 2011.

Season
Bayern were involved during the winter transfer, with Bayern adding Luiz Gustavo from 1899 Hoffenheim and David Alaba moving the other way in a loan deal. Martín Demichelis was sold to Málaga and one week before the end of the winter transfer period, captain Mark van Bommel requested to be released from his contract and moved to Milan. Edson Braafheid also signed for 1899 Hoffenheim on a permanent basis, while Maximilian Haas also left the club, signing for English team Middlesbrough on the last day of the winter transfer window.

Competitions

Bundesliga
The Bundesliga campaign began on 20 August when Bayern played in the opening game of the season against VfL Wolfsburg.

League table

DFB-Pokal

UEFA Champions League

Bayern Munich qualified for the group stage of the 2010–11 UEFA Champions League by winning the Bundesliga in 2009–10. There they were drawn into Group E with Italian runners-up Roma, Swiss double champions Basel and Romanian champions CFR Cluj. Bayern finished the group in first place with a club record of 15 points. In the Round of 16 they were drawn against their opponent from the previous Champions League final, Internazionale.

Group stage

Knockout phase

Round of 16

DFL-Supercup

Bayern faced Schalke 04 in the first official DFL-Supercup in 14 years. Normally, the league champions would play the cup winners, but as Bayern won both titles, they faced the league's runners-up, Schalke 04.

Friendlies

LIGA total! Cup 2010
Bayern played in the 2010 LIGA total! Cup. The tournament was held in the Veltins-Arena and organized by Bayern's prime sponsor, Deutsche Telekom. In this tournament matches consisted of two 30 minutes halves each. The Reds faced Köln in the first game and Schalke 04 in the second game.

Other friendlies
The fanclub "Fanclub Lohner Bayern Union" won the right to host the annual Dream Game, a game Bayern contests against one of its fanclubs with the earnings going to charity.

On the final day of their training camp in Riva del Garda Bayern faced a selection of players from Trentino in a friendly.

Bayern hosted a team selected by their sponsor, the Fitness First company, on 8 August. The Fitness First Winterstars team consisted of several Winter Olympic Games gold medal winners and four fans. The money raised in the match will be used to support Munich's candidacy for the 2018 Winter Olympics.

In the final friendly of the 2010 pre-season, Bayern hosted Real Madrid. The game has been called the Beckenbauer testimonial match as Franz Beckenbauer did not receive a proper farewell game when he left the club in 1977 for New York Cosmos. Incidentally, José Mourinho, the coach who bested Bayern in the previous Champions League final with Internazionale, led Madrid.

On 17 November, Bayern arranged a friendly against Unterhaching on short notice with several of the players were away with their national sides. The primary aim was to give previously injured players Franck Ribéry, Breno and Diego Contento some match practice.

Bayern attends three post-season friendlies before the summer break.

Players

Squad information

Goalscorers

All competitions

Bundesliga

UEFA Champions League

DFB-Pokal

Information current as of end of 14 May 2011

Transfers and loans

Transfers in

Total spending:  €15,000,000

Transfers out

Total income:  €8,000,000–9,000,000

Management and coaching staff
Since the beginning of the 2009–10 season, Louis van Gaal is the manager of Bayern Munich. He brought some personnel of his own to the club.

References

External links
FC Bayern Munich Official Website in English
UEFA Website

2010-11
German football clubs 2010–11 season
2010–11 UEFA Champions League participants seasons